is a  mountain on the border of Gunma Prefecture and Niigata Prefecture in Japan. It is one of the 100 famous mountains in Japan.

Routes

The mountain trail leading to the summit of Mount Tanigawa from four directions: north, south, east and west. The easiest and most popular is the southern route via the aerial tramway, and many families reach the summit on holidays.

Rock climbing routes are graded according to the Japanese Ice Climbing Rating from I-VI and there are numerous routes along the Eastern Ridges, with significant rock routes for summer climbing.

Like many mountains in Japan, there is no officially recorded first ascent. Many mountains have a religious significance and have been hiked and summitted by Japanese religious ascetics for hundreds of years.

Weather
The mountain lies on the border of Gunma and Niigata Prefectures and sits precisely where the weather systems from the Asian continent and the Pacific meet in often furious displays of extreme weather. Cornices on the ridge can reach out over 20 metres and occur at lower levels of the mountain as well as along the summit ridge. When avalanche risk is high, the consequences can be particularly dangerous given the steep terrain and over 1000m of relief to gather force.

Safety
Although many trekking routes leading to the summit are relatively safe, there have been many deaths due to rock climbing, so it is sometimes called "mountain of death". 
As of December 2014, since its initial exploration and route-finding in the early 1930s, a total of 805 people have died on Tanigawa-dake. (Compare with the approximately 200 people who have died on Mt. Everest over a comparable period.) In 1943, a climbing party disappeared on the mountain. They were not found until another climbing party stumbled upon their remains in 1973. In the 1960s, there was a famous rescue attempt of Japanese climbers on the main face who had died of exposure. Their bodies were eventually brought down when the Japanese Self-Defense Forces cut the rope with gunfire in order to retrieve the bodies.

Japan offers a high level of support with helicopter trained mountain rescue teams, though with high wind there is always the chance that they cannot be deployed. Along the upper ridges are two safety huts. One is the emergency hut for 2-3 near Ichinokura-dake (一ノ倉岳), which may be hard to find on deep snow and therefore unusable. The much larger "Shoulder Hut" below the summit of Tanigawa-Dake is much more spacious, but is unheated and unmanned in winter.

Sometimes called the mountain of death, the mountain is bedecked at all levels with commemorative plaques for those who have died on the mountain. Some of these groups have been rather large. Near the base of the mountain is a large sculpted piton, with an adjoining wall inscribed with the names of all those who have died on the mountain.

Misc
The closest train station is Doai Station (土合駅).

Climbing Mount Tanigawa is one of the main storylines in the novel Climber's High, which was made into an NHK documentary in 2005 and a movie in 2008.

Japanese clothing and lifestyle retailer Snow Peak is named after Mount Tanigawa.

In Gunma's Jomo Karuta, Mount Tanigawa is featured on the 'mi' card.

Gallery

See also

 List of the 100 famous mountains in Japan
 Tanigawadake Ropeway

References

Tanigawa